The 1874 West Somerset by-election was held on 12 January 1874.  The by-election was held due to the death of the incumbent MP of the Conservative Party, William Gore-Langton.  It was won by the Conservative candidate Vaughan Lee, who was unopposed.

References

1874 in England
1874 elections in the United Kingdom
By-elections to the Parliament of the United Kingdom in Somerset constituencies
19th century in Somerset
Unopposed by-elections to the Parliament of the United Kingdom in English constituencies